Peskovatsky is a rural locality (a khutor) in Nezhinskoye Rural Settlement, Olkhovsky District, Volgograd Oblast, Russia. The population was 129 as of 2010. There are 2 streets.

Geography 
Peskovatsky is located in steppe, on south of the Volga Upland, 38 km northwest of Olkhovka (the district's administrative centre) by road. Nezhinsky is the nearest rural locality.

References 

Rural localities in Olkhovsky District